The Council of Orléans 621 was a council of Roman Catholic Church bishops, held in 621 in the city of Orléans, France.

See also
Council of Orléans

References

621
Orléans,621
7th century in Francia
Orléans,621
History of Orléans